Pieczyński (feminine: Pieczyńska; plural: Pieczyńscy) is a Polish surname. Notable people with this surname include:

 Andrzej Pieczyński (born 1956), Polish actor
 Emma Pieczynska-Reichenbach (1854–1927), Swiss abolitionist and feminist
 Krzysztof Pieczyński (born 1957), Polish actor
 Małgorzata Pieczyńska (born 1960), Polish actress

See also
 

Polish-language surnames